The Cleveland Bearcats were an American professional Minor League Baseball team that played in Cleveland, Ohio, in 1914 and 1915 as members of the American Association. They shared League Park with the American League's Cleveland Naps. After the 1913 season, Charles Somers, owner of the Toledo Mud Hens and Cleveland Naps, relocated the Toledo team to Cleveland. The team played the 1914 season as the Cleveland Bearcats but became the Cleveland Spiders in 1915. The team moved back to Toledo in 1916.

References

Baseball teams established in 1914
Sports clubs disestablished in 1915
Defunct minor league baseball teams
Defunct American Association (1902–1997) teams
Baseball teams in Cleveland
Professional baseball teams in Ohio
1914 establishments in Ohio
1915 disestablishments in Ohio
Defunct baseball teams in Ohio
Baseball teams disestablished in 1915